Raju Mathew ( – 12 November 2019) was an Indian film producer from Kerala. He produced 45 films. He was the owner of Century Films.

Biography
Mathew worked in an insurance company before coming to the film arena. Later he gave up the job and established Century Films in 1979. Then he began to produce films. He produced mainly Malayalam films. Besides Malayalam films he also produced a Hindi film titled Anokha Rishta.  Athiran was the last film which was produced by him. He was the president of the Kerala Film Chamber of Commerce.

Mathew was married to Lily Mathew. Anjana Jacob and Ranjana Mathew are their daughters.

Mathew died on 12 November 2019 at the age of 82.

Selected filmography

Malayalam
 Kelkkaatha Sabdham (1982)
 Karyam Nissaram (1983)
 Pinnilavu (1983)
 Sandhyakku Virinja Poovu (1983)
 Athirathram (1984)
 Adiyozhukkukal (1984)
 Aalkkoottathil Thaniye (1984)
 Ariyatha Veethikal (1984)
 Avidathe Pole Ivideyum (1985)
 Karimpinpoovinakkare (1985)
 Anubandham (1985)
 Adimakal Udamakal (1987)
 Vrutham (1987)
 Mukthi (1988)
 Shubhayathra (1990)
 Aanaval Mothiram (1991)
 Samooham (1993)
 Thanmathra (2005)
 Money Ratnam (2014)
 Athiran (2019)

Hindi
 Anokha Rishta (1986)

Awards

 2005 - National Film Award for Best Feature Film in Malayalam (producer) - Thanmathra
 2005 - Kerala State Film Award for Best Film (producer) - Thanmathra
 2005 - Amrita TV Film Award for Best Film (producer) - Thanmathra
 1985 - Filmfare Award for Best Film – Malayalam for Aalkkoottathil Thaniye

References

Malayalam film producers
Hindi film producers
1930s births
2019 deaths
Film producers from Kerala